Mumbedah is a civil parish, a creek and a hill in central New South Wales.

Mumbedah Parish is a civil parish of County of Napier, a county of  the central western part of New South Wales, Australia in Warrumbungle Shire.

History
Before European settlement the surrounding area was occupied by the Gamilaroi and Wiradjuri peoples. 
Allan Cunningham was the first British explorer to discover the area in 1823 while travelling through Pandoras Pass over the Warrumbungle ranges to the Liverpool Plains.

References

Localities in New South Wales
Geography of New South Wales
Central West (New South Wales)